Indian Iron and Steel Company Stanton Pipe Factory Ground or Pipe Factory Ground is a cricket ground Ujjain, Madhya Pradesh. The ground hosted two Ranji matches for the Madhya Pradesh cricket team in 1977 against Railways cricket team which was abandoned without a ball being played  and again in 1980 against Rajasthan cricket team, when the match was a draw.

References

External links 
 Ground Info
 Cricketarchives
 wikimapia

Sports venues in Ujjain
Buildings and structures in Ujjain
Cricket grounds in Madhya Pradesh
Sports venues completed in 1977
1977 establishments in Madhya Pradesh
20th-century architecture in India